A miskal is a type of panpipe found in Iran, Turkey and Azerbaijan.

References

Iranian musical instruments
Azerbaijani musical instruments
Turkish musical instruments
Early musical instruments
Panpipes